Wila Qullu (Aymara wila red, blood, qullu mountain, "red mountain", Hispanicized spelling Wila Kkollu) is a mountain in the Oruro Department in the Andes of Bolivia, about  high. Wila Qullu is situated in the Sajama Province, in the west of the Curahuara de Carangas Municipality, west of the extinct Sajama volcano and north-east of the Paya Chata mountains. It lies south-west of the mountain Phaq'u Q'awa.

References

Mountains of Oruro Department